"Count Me In" is a song written by Chuck Jones and co-written and recorded by American country music artist Deana Carter.  It was released in March 1997 as the third single from her debut album Did I Shave My Legs for This?.  It was a Top 10 hit on both the Billboard Hot Country Singles & Tracks and Canadian RPM Country Singles charts.

Content
The song is a soft love ballad, with the instrumentation starting lightly and building up towards the end with an electric guitar bridge. The song's lyrics speak of a narrator who is telling a lover what she does and doesn't want in her relationship.

Music video 
A music video was released for "Count Me In", directed by Michael McNamara. In the video, scenes of Carter  singing in front of the camera are shot in color. Black and white is used when she is singing on a stage, signing autographs for her fans, and just acting silly for the camera.

Chart performance

Year-end charts

References

1997 singles
Deana Carter songs
Country ballads
Songs written by Deana Carter
Songs written by Chuck Jones (songwriter)
Capitol Records Nashville singles
Song recordings produced by Chris Farren (country musician)
1996 songs
1990s ballads